Ted Corbett may refer to:
 Ted Corbett (journalist)
 Ted Corbett (chemist)

See also
 Ted Corbitt, American long-distance runner
 Edward Corbett (disambiguation)